La Pistola y El Corazón (Spanish for "The Pistol and the Heart") is the fourth album by the Mexican American rock group Los Lobos, released in September 1988 on Slash/Warner Bros. Records. The mini-album is dedicated to Tejano/Mariachi folk music. It won a Grammy Award in 1989 for Best Mexican-American Performance.

The cover is a painting by East L.A. Chicano artist George Yepes, who conceived the image after listening to a demo of the album. "It is a perfect marriage between the musical and the visual," said band member Louie Pérez. "George’s painting directs you to the heart of the whole record. It has the same tough image as the music itself." The original painting was purchased by Warner Brothers Records and given to singer Madonna as a gift. Shortly afterwards, the painting was destroyed when a fire burned down Madonna's Malibu home. The cover has won numerous awards and was, in 1999, selected as one of the 100 Best Album Covers of All Time by the editors of Rolling Stone Magazine.

Reception

Geoffrey Himes of the Washington Post was positive in his review of the album, saying that it finds Los Lobos "approaching the tunes not as nostalgia or folklorico but as confessional dramas requiring all the individual verve they can muster. The playing and singing is not only technically marvelous ... but also emotionally urgent." Himes added that the album "lacks the grand ambition of Los Lobos' best records, but it succeeds marvelously at what it sets out to do."

In a retrospective review, rating the album three stars out of five, William Ruhlmann of AllMusic wrote, "If this is a band that seems to do too many things well, in a sense they are at their best when they narrow their focus, and they are certainly masters of their style here."

Track listing

Personnel 
Los Lobos
 David Hidalgo – requinto jarocho (1, 8), vocals (1, 3, 8), violin (2, 4, 6), accordion (3, 5, 9), guitar (5, 7), lead vocals (6, 9), huapanguera (8)
 Cesar Rosas – lead vocals (1, 2, 3, 5, 7, 8), guitar (1, 4, 5, 7, 8), huapanguera (2, 6, 9), bajo sexto (3), vocals (6)
 Louie Pérez – jarana (1, 4, 6, 8, 9), vocals (1, 6, 8), snare drum (2, 3), vihuela (5), brushes (7)
 Conrad Lozano – guitarron (1, 2, 4, 5, 6, 9), vocals (1), tololoche (3, 7, 8)
 Steve Berlin – soprano saxophone (3, 5, 9)
Additional musicians
 Mouse – bells (2)
 The Lost Tribe Percussion Ensemble – sonajas (4)
Production
 Los Lobos – producer
 Larry Hirsch – engineer, mixing
 Scott Woodman – engineer
 Stephen Marcussen – mastering
 George Yepes – cover, design
 Louie Pérez – cover, cover concept
 Jeri Heiden – art direction

Awards

Billboard charts

Grammy Awards

References

Los Lobos albums
1988 albums
Slash Records albums
Grammy Award for Best Mexican/Mexican-American Album